The Australian cricket team in England in 1899 played 35 first-class matches including five Tests, the first time that a series in England had consisted of more than three matches. It was also the first time that a panel of selectors was appointed; previously the authority for the ground where the match was to be played was responsible for selecting the side.

The First Test at Trent Bridge saw W G Grace make his final appearance for England, while Wilfred Rhodes made his Test debut in the same match.

Test series summary
Australia won the Test series 1–0, with four matches drawn.

First Test

Second Test

Third Test

Fourth Test

Fifth Test

External sources
 CricketArchive – tour summaries

Annual reviews
 James Lillywhite's Cricketers' Annual (Red Lilly) 1900
 Wisden Cricketers' Almanack 1900

Further reading
 Bill Frindall, The Wisden Book of Test Cricket 1877-1978, Wisden, 1979
 Chris Harte, A History of Australian Cricket, Andre Deutsch, 1993
 Ray Robinson, On Top Down Under, Cassell, 1975

1899 in Australian cricket
1899 in English cricket
1899
English cricket seasons in the 19th century
International cricket competitions from 1888–89 to 1918
1899
1899 sports events in London